Sheila Jordan (born Sheila Jeanette Dawson; November 18, 1928) is an American jazz singer and songwriter. She has recorded as a session musician with an array of critically acclaimed artists in addition to recording her own albums. Jordan pioneered a bebop and scat jazz singing style with an upright bass as the only accompaniment. Jordan's music has earned praise from many critics, particularly for her ability to improvise lyrics; Scott Yanow describes her as "one of the most consistently creative of all jazz singers." Charlie Parker often introduced Jordan as "the lady with the million dollar ears."

Biography

Early career
Sheila Jordan grew up in Summerhill, Pennsylvania, United States, before returning to her birthplace of Detroit, Michigan, in 1940. She sang and played piano in jazz clubs in Detroit. She was a member of the trio Skeeter, Mitch, and Jean (Skeeter Spight, Leroi Mitchell, and Jordan was "Jean"), which wrote lyrics to music by Charlie Parker. They went to Parker's performances in Detroit, met him, and he would ask them to sing.

In 1951, Jordan moved to New York City and studied harmony and music theory with Lennie Tristano and Charles Mingus, but she concentrated on the music of Charlie Parker. Jordan and Parker became friends before his death in 1955. She refers to him as one of her teachers. From 1952–1962, she was married to Duke Jordan, who played piano in Parker's band.

In a 2012 interview with JazzWax, when asked why she moved to New York, Jordan said, "I guess I was chasin' the Bird [Parker]." When asked if the song "Chasin' the Bird" was written for her, she replied, "No. I don't know how that rumor got started."

1960s
In the early 1960s, Jordan performed at the Page Three Club in Greenwich Village with pianist Herbie Nichols, and at other bars and clubs in New York City. For much of the 1960s, she withdrew from clubs to raise her daughter, and she sang in church instead. She was a typist and legal secretary for twenty years with little time to concentrate on music until the age of 58.

In 1962, she worked with George Russell, with whom she recorded the song, "You Are My Sunshine" on his album The Outer View (Riverside). Later that year she recorded the album Portrait of Sheila which was released by Blue Note. Her long working relationship with Steve Kuhn began in the early 1960s. She also played with Don Heckman (1967–68), Lee Konitz (1972), and Roswell Rudd (1972–75).

1970s to present

In 1974, Jordan was Artist in Residence at City College of New York and taught there from 1978–2005. In 2006, she was presented the Manhattan Association of Cabarets & Clubs (MAC) Lifetime Achievement Award and celebrated 28 years as an Adjunct Professor of Music. She has taught at University of Massachusetts at Amherst and the Vermont Jazz Center, InterplayJazz and Arts, as well as teaching international workshops.

On July 12, 1975, she recorded Confirmation. One year later she released the duet album Sheila, with Arild Andersen for SteepleChase. In 1979, she founded a quartet with Steve Kuhn, Harvie S, and Bob Moses. During the 1980s, she worked with Harvie S as a duo and played on several records with him. Until 1987 she worked in an advertising agency and recorded Lost and Found in 1989.

Jordan is a songwriter who works in bebop and free jazz. In addition to the aforementioned musicians, she has recorded with the George Gruntz Concert Jazz Band, Cameron Brown, Carla Bley, and Steve Swallow. In the UK she appeared with former John Dankworth Band vocalist Frank Holder. She has led recordings for Blue Note, Blackhawk, East Wind, ECM, Grapevine, Muse, Palo Alto, and SteepleChase

In 2012, she received the NEA Jazz Masters Award. Her biography, Jazz Child: A Portrait of Sheila Jordan, written by vocalist and educator Ellen Johnson, was published in 2014.

Awards and honors 
 2006 Manhattan Association of Cabarets & Clubs Lifetime Achievement Award
 2007 International Association for Jazz Education Humanitarian Award
 2008 Mary Lou Williams' Women in Jazz for Lifetime of Service
 2010 New York Nightlife Award – Outstanding Jazz Vocalist
 2012 National Endowment for the Arts Jazz Master Award – Lifetime Honors Award
 2018 Bistro Award Outstanding Contributions to the Art of Jazz

Discography

As leader 
 Portrait of Sheila (Blue Note, 1963) – recorded in 1962
 Confirmation (East Wind, 1975)
 Sheila with Johnny Knapp (Grapevine, 1977)
 Sheila with Arild Andersen (SteepleChase, 1978) – recorded in 1977
 Playground with Steve Kuhn (ECM, 1980) – recorded in 1979
 Old Time Feeling with Harvie S (Palo Alto, 1983) – recorded in 1982
 The Crossing (BlackHawk, 1984)
 Body and Soul (CBS/Sony, 1987)
 Lost and Found (Muse, 1990)
 Songs from Within with Harvie Swartz (MA, 1993)
 One for Junior with Mark Murphy (Muse, 1993)
 Heart Strings (Muse, 1994)
 Jazz Child with Steve Kuhn (HighNote, 1999)
 Sheila's Back in Town (Splasc(h), 1999)
 The Very Thought of Two with Harvie Swartz (MA, 2000)
 Little Song with Steve Kuhn (HighNote, 2003)
 Celebration with Cameron Brown (HighNote, 2005)
 Straight Ahead (Splasc(h), 2005) – recorded in 2004
 Winter Sunshine (Justin Time, 2008)
 Live At Mezzrow (Cellar Live, 2022) – live recorded in 2021

As featured vocalist
With Carla Bley
 Escalator over the Hill (JCOA, 1971)

With Cameron Brown
 Here and How! (OmniTone 1997)
 I've Grown Accustomed to the Bass (HighNote, 2000)

With Jane Bunnett
 The Water Is Wide (1993)

With George Gruntz
 Theatre (ECM, 1983)

With Bob Moses
 When Elephants Dream of Music (Rykodisc, 1982)

With Roswell Rudd
 Flexible Flyer (Arista/Freedom 1974)
 Blown Bone (Philips, 1979)
 Broad Strokes (Knitting Factory, 2000)

With Steve Swallow
 Home (ECM, 1980)

Academia 
Former students

 Laura Valle

References

External links
 Official site
 Official site for Jazz Child: A Portrait of Sheila Jordan by Ellen Johnson 
 Interview at vancouverjazz.com
 Jazz Italia article
 National Public Radio program with Billy Taylor
 One Final Note feature from 2005
 Sheila Jordan interviewed by Eric Jackson on WGBH's Eric in the Evening
 2009 interview with Alyn Shipton for BBC Radio 3's 'Jazz Library' series

1928 births
Living people
American women jazz singers
American jazz singers
Bebop singers
Scat singers
Singers from Detroit
Blue Note Records artists
ECM Records artists
HighNote Records artists
Muse Records artists
Palo Alto Records artists
SteepleChase Records artists
Jazz musicians from Michigan
Justin Time Records artists
21st-century American women